The 2008 All-Big Ten Conference football team consists of American football players chosen as All-Big Ten Conference players for the 2008 Big Ten Conference football season.  The conference recognizes two official All-Big Ten selectors: (1) the Big Ten conference coaches selected separate offensive and defensive units and named first- and second-team players (the "Coaches" team); and (2) a panel of sports writers and broadcasters covering the Big Ten also selected offensive and defensive units and named first- and second-team players (the "Media" team).

Offensive selections

Quarterbacks
 Daryll Clark, Penn State (Coaches-1; Media-1)
 Adam Weber, Minnesota (Coaches-2)
 Juice Williams, Illinois (Media-2)

Running backs
 Shonn Greene, Iowa (Coaches-1; Media-1)
 Javon Ringer, Michigan State (Coaches-1; Media-1)
 Beanie Wells, Ohio State (Coaches-2; Media-2)
 Evan Royster, Penn State (Coaches-2; Media-2)

Receivers
 Eric Decker, Minnesota (Coaches-1; Media-1)
 Derrick Williams, Penn State (Coaches-1; Media-2)
 Arrelious Benn, Illinois (Coaches-2; Media-1)
 David Gilreath, Wisconsin (Coaches-2)
 Deon Butler, Penn State (Media-2)

Centers
 A. Q. Shipley, Penn State (Coaches-1; Media-1)
 Rob Bruggeman, Iowa (Coaches-2; Media-2 [tie])
 Ryan McDonald, Illinois (Media-2 [tie])

Guards
 Seth Olsen, Iowa (Coaches-1; Media-1)
 Rich Ohrnberger, Penn State (Coaches-1; Media-1)
 Kraig Urbik, Wisconsin (Coaches-2; Media-2)
 Stefen Wisniewski, Penn State (Coaches-2)
 Roland Martin, Michigan State (Media-2)

Tackles
 Alex Boone, Ohio State (Coaches-1; Media-1)
 Gerald Cadogan, Penn State (Coaches-1; Media-1)
 Xavier Fulton, Illinois (Coaches-2; Media-2)
 Bryan Bulaga, Iowa (Coaches-2)
 Kyle Calloway, Iowa (Media-2)
 Jesse Miller, Michigan State (Media-2)

Tight ends
 Brandon Myers, Iowa (Coaches-1)
 Garrett Graham, Wisconsin (Coaches-2; Media-1)
 Jack Simmons, Minnesota (Media-2)

Defensive selections

Defensive linemen
 Mitch King, Iowa (Coaches-1; Media-1)
 Aaron Maybin, Penn State (Coaches-1; Media-1)
 Jammie Kirlew, Indiana (Coaches-2; Media-1)
 Jared Odrick, Penn State (Coaches-1; Media-2)
 Willie VanDeSteeg, Minnesota (Coaches-2; Media-1)
 Corey Wootton, Northwestern (Coaches-1; Media-2)
 Brandon Graham, Michigan (Coaches-2)
 Matt Kroul, Iowa (Media-2)
 Mike Newkirk, Wisconsin (Coaches-2)

Linebackers
 Navorro Bowman, Penn State (Coaches-1; Media-1)
 James Laurinaitis, Ohio State (Coaches-1; Media-1)
 Greg Jones, Michigan State (Coaches-1; Media-2)
 Brit Miller, Illinois (Coaches-2; Media-1)
 Pat Angerer, Iowa (Coaches-2; Media-2)
 Marcus Freeman, Ohio State (Coaches-2; Media-2)

Defensive backs
 Vontae Davis, Illinois (Coaches-1; Media-1)
 Malcolm Jenkins, Ohio State (Coaches-1; Media-1)
 Otis Wiley, Michigan State (Coaches-1; Media-1)
 Anthony Scirrotto, Penn State (Coaches-1; Media-2)
 Allen Langford, Wisconsin (Coaches-2; Media-1)
 Traye Simmons, Minnesota (Coaches-2; Media-2)
 Kurt Coleman, Ohio State (Media-2)
 Lydell Sargeant, Penn State (Media-2)
 Amari Spievey, Iowa (Coaches-2)
 Jay Valai, Wisconsin (Coaches-2)

Special teams

Kickers
 Kevin Kelly, Penn State (Coaches-1; Media-1)
 Brett Swenson, Michigan State (Coaches-2; Media-2)

Punter
 Zoltan Mesko, Michigan (Coaches-1; Media-1)
 Ryan Donahue, Iowa (Coaches-2)
 Aaron Bates, Michigan State (Media-2)

Key

See also
 2008 College Football All-America Team

References

All-Big Ten Conference
All-Big Ten Conference football teams